Su Jain-rong (born 12 November 1961) is a Taiwanese politician.

Education
Su obtained his master's degree in economics from National Chung Hsing University and doctoral degree in economics from Pennsylvania State University in the United States.

Political careers
Su has served as the Political Deputy Minister of Finance since 20 May 2016. On 12 July 2018, it was announced that Su would replace Sheu Yu-jer as the Minister of Finance starting on 16 July 2018.

References

1961 births
Living people
National Chung Hsing University alumni
Pennsylvania State University alumni
Taiwanese Ministers of Finance